John Ridley (born 1965) is an American writer.

John Ridley may also refer to:

John S. Ridley (1882–1934) politician in Manitoba, Canada
John Ridley (centre-half) (fl. 1927–1933), English football player for Manchester City
John Ridley (footballer) (1952–2020), English football player for Port Vale, Leicester City and Chesterfield
John Ridley (inventor) (1806–1887), English-born miller and farming machinery inventor and manufacturer in South Australia
Jack Ridley (engineer) (John Wallace Ridley, 1919–2006), New Zealand engineer and politician
John Ridley (cricketer) (1879–1903), English cricketer

See also
Jack Ridley (disambiguation)